Radič Božić (fl. 1502 – September 1528) was titular Despot of Serbia, from 1527 until his death in September 1528. He was one of the most notable military commanders among Serbian nobility in the Eastern Hungarian Kingdom, and fought against the Ottoman Empire in several battles, most notably the Battle of Mohács.

Life

By the end of the 15th century, he left Ottoman-occupied Serbia for Hungary, and received the towns of Solymos and Lippa by Hungarian king. He was part of the Hungarian-Serbian army that crossed into Serbia and Bulgaria in 1502 and burnt the Ottoman bases at Braničevo, Kladovo, Vidin and Nikopol.

In 1522, shortly after the Siege of Belgrade (1521), he became the commander of a flotilla, with 500 chaiki. Together with Pál Tomori he defeated the Bosnian pasha Ferhat at Manđelos in Syrmia, on August 12, 1523. Although he already was elderly and sick, he defeated an Ottoman band at Petrovaradin in 1526, then participated in the Battle of Mohács, as well as destroying an Ottoman Army department at Titel after the battle. John Zápolya called him the most revered Serbian person in Hungary.

During the succession war between two rivals for the Hungarian crown, Ferdinand Habsburg and John Zápolya, he took the side of Zápolya, while Stjepan Berislavić (titular Despot of Serbia) opted for king Ferdinand. In 1527, king John decided to create his own Despot of Serbia, in order to attract Serbian nobility and soldiers to his side, and chose Radič, granting him the title. As newly created Despot of Serbia, he remained loyal to king John until his death in September 1528.

See also
 History of Ottoman Serbia

References

Sources

 
 
 
 
 
 

Despots of Serbia
16th-century Serbian monarchs
16th-century Serbian nobility
16th-century Hungarian nobility
Eastern Hungarian Kingdom
1528 deaths
Year of birth uncertain